Fadi Rifai (born 5 January 1967) is a Lebanese television and voice actor.

Filmography

Television

Plays

Dubbing roles 

1001 Nights - Shahryar (first voice)
Adventure Time - Additional Voices
Batman: The Animated Series - Hamilton Hill, Riddler, Sewer King (Lebanese dub)
Teen Titans: Trouble in Tokyo - Commander Uehara Daizo
The Looney Tunes Show (Lebanese dub)
The Men of Angelos - The Emperor
Lego Nexo Knights - Merlock, Book of Monsters/ Monstrox
Mr. Bean (animated TV series) - Additional Voices
Mokhtarnameh - Hani ibn Urwa, Ibn Hammam
Over the Garden Wall (miniseries) - The Beast
Steven Universe - Mayor William "Bill" Dewey, Mr. Harold Smiley, Peedee Fryman (first voice), Fryman (first voice), Jamie, Mr. Gus, Buck Dewey (Historical Friction episode)
Teen Titans Go! - Trigon (MBC 3 version)
Uncle Grandpa - Mr. Gus, Hot Dog Person
Wabbit - Sir Littlechin, Shameless O'Scanty
Tekken 7 - Shaheen
Pokémon: Advanced - The Narrator
Pokémon Journeys - Professor Cerise

Commercials 
Rifai also starred in Amour Lebanese Cheese commercial

References

External links

Living people
Lebanese male television actors
Lebanese male voice actors
Year of birth missing (living people)
21st-century Lebanese male actors